Price Your Bike was a Swiss UCI Continental cycling team that existed from 2006 to 2011.

References

Defunct cycling teams based in Switzerland
Cycling teams based in Switzerland
Cycling teams established in 2006
Cycling teams disestablished in 2011
UCI Continental Teams (Europe)